Tennis at the 1951 Pan American Games was held at Buenos Aires in March 1951.


Medal events

References 
  .
 
 

1951
Events at the 1951 Pan American Games
Pan American Games
1951 Pan American Games